Cistus libanotis is a shrubby species of flowering plant in the family Cistaceae, with white flowers. It has been confused with Cistus clusii, which it resembles, resulting in some uncertainty in its distribution. It is endemic to the Iberian Peninsula (in southern Portugal and southwestern Spain).

Description
The upper surfaces of the leaves have only a few stellate hairs, particularly on the margins and the veins; the lower surfaces have a conspicuous vein and two dense bands of short stellate hairs. The flowers are arranged in cymes or whorls, the top group forming an umbel of three or four flowers. The stamens are unequal in length, longer than the pistil. The style is short.

Distribution and habitat
Cistus libanotis is native to the southwestern Iberian Peninsula (southern Portugal and south-west Spain) where it is commonly found in dry, sandy coastal areas from Campo de Gibraltar to Cape St. Vincent and between Alcácer do Sal and Grândola, but it can also be found as far inland as Paradas, Seville. There are records of this species in Morocco, Algeria and Tunisia, although these may belong to Cistus libanotis auct. non L., i.e. C. clusii.

Taxonomy
Cistus libanotis was first described by Carl Linnaeus in 1759. A different but similar species, Cistus clusii, has regularly been mis-identified as this species. A 2011 molecular phylogenetic study placed C. libanotis in the white and whitish pink clade of Cistus species. No strong relationship with C. clusii was found.

The specific epithet libanotis was the word used for rosemary by Pliny.

Phylogeny
Cistus libanotis belongs to the white and whitish pink flowered clade of Cistus species.

References

External links

; includes photograph

libanotis
Taxa named by Carl Linnaeus
Endemic flora of the Iberian Peninsula